Scott Lutes (born 25 September 1962) is a Canadian Paralympic sailor. He bronze team medalled at the 2016 Summer Paralympics in the Three-Person Keelboat (Sonar).

References

External links 
 Scott Lutes - Cœur Handisport

External links
 
 

1962 births
Living people
Canadian male sailors (sport)
Paralympic bronze medalists for Canada
Paralympic sailors of Canada
Sailors at the 2012 Summer Paralympics
Sailors at the 2016 Summer Paralympics
Sportspeople from Moncton
Medalists at the 2016 Summer Paralympics
Paralympic medalists in sailing